Cleversafe Inc. was an object storage software and systems developer company. It was founded in 2004 by Chris Gladwin, an American technology entrepreneur. The company was acquired by IBM in 2015, and became an integral part of IBM Cloud Object Storage.

History
Cleversafe Inc was launched as a startup company in 2004 by Chris Gladwin, an American inventor, computer engineer and technology entrepreneur. Gladwin created Cleversafe because his prior company, MusicNow, Inc., deployed systems to store all digitized music and he felt that approach used by the enterprise data storage products could be vastly improved. 
Cleversafe had its headquarters in Chicago, Illinois, and was originally based in Illinois Institute of Technology incubator, where the company matured for the first years of its existence. From the beginning, Cleversafe's initial focus as a startup was on developing new dispersed storage technology for unstructured data in the petabyte-plus range, which the company called " Dispersed Storage Network" or dsNet. According to New York Times and other sources, Cleversafe's approach was to break the data into pieces and then disperses it in multiple locations around the world in order to additionally enhance data security. The initial funding was provided by OCA Ventures. Chairman and investor Christopher Galvin recruited John Morris as its new president and CEO in 2013 to build a more aggressive sales and marketing culture. Within two years, Morris rapidly expanded sales and successfully increased the value of Cleversafe from $50 million to the $1.4 billion paid by IBM when it purchased the company three years later in 2015.

Awards
In 2008, Cleversafe was a winner of the Chicago Innovation Awards in the category "Data Backup and Security". In 2011, it was also supported by In-Q-Tel, a venture capital firm related to the US intelligence community. Forbes notes: "In 2013, the company was the 2nd largest cloud storage vendor by volume and received over $100 million in venture funding from NEA, OCA Ventures, Presideo, Motorola Solutions, BVC and Alsop Louis Partners. In 2015, John Morris was named CEO of the Year by the Illinois Technology Association at its 16th annual CityLights Awards for his leadership of Cleversafe.

Technology application
Cleversafe developed and commercialized a method for storing data by virtualizing the data using information dispersal algorithms and distributing slices of data across a number (N) of different servers where only a threshold (M) of those servers needed to be available in order for the original data to be fully available. This method allowed a configurable number (M-N) of servers to fail while maintaining complete data availability. With a low overhead of 1 – M/N, information dispersal provided very high data availability and reliability as compared to making multiple copies. Unlike traditional file systems that use a tree-like hierarchical structure that can be difficult to scale as the file system grows into the millions or billions of files, Cleversafe provided an object storage system using the REST protocol to store very large amounts of data in a flat system where files are identified by unique object IDs. Cleversafe developed a technology called SecureSlice – a confidentiality feature that virtualizes and encrypts unstructured data, stores the key with that data and then breaks up that data, making the slices unrecognizable and inherently secure by placing it on several different storage nodes. The company also develop PerfectBits, a technology to ensure that every bit in a digital object is read exactly as written, even when reading massive amounts of data where the number of bits read is greater than the bit error rate of computer hardware.

Patents
Cleversafe developed a significant patent portfolio for large object storage systems. In 2013, the company was listed on IEEE Spectrum’s Patent Power index. At the time of its acquisition by the IBM, the company had 318 patents granted by the US Patent and Trademark Office. Jason Resch was the most prolific inventor at Cleversafe and was a named inventor on 139 issued US patents and 315 patent applications in 2015.

Acquisition by IBM
In November 2015, under the guidance of CEO John Morris, Cleversafe was acquired by IBM for $1.3 billion and became an integral part of its IBM Cloud Object Storage division. The acquisition was made to fill a technological gap of the IBM's cloud storage capability, specifically by applying its dispersed object storage technology, which "encrypts unstructured data, stores the key with the data, and then breaks up that data and puts it on several different storage nodes." As Network Computing stated: "With the acquisition of object storage and erasure coding technologies, IBM bolsters its cloud position." As a result of the IBM acquisition, Cleversafe’s venture capital investors got back 10 times their original investments. Industry media outlet Built in Chicago pointed out that a “high-profile acquisition of that caliber is a rare feat for Chicago-based tech businesses, with few businesses setting as high a precedent.

References

Computer storage companies
IBM acquisitions
2015 mergers and acquisitions
Defunct software companies of the United States
Technology companies established in 2004
Electronics companies of the United States
2004 establishments in Illinois